Geranium viscosissimum, commonly known as the sticky purple geranium, is a perennial in the flowering plant family Geraniaceae. It is thought to be a protocarnivorous plant.

Distribution
This herbaceous perennial plant is native to the Northwestern United States, California, and Nevada, including in the Great Basin and Rocky Mountains regions; and to Western Canada, including in the Canadian Rockies.

Description

The stem, leaves, and flower stalks are covered with sticky hairs. The right-green leaves are dissected, many-toothed, and deeply-lobed.

Its bloom period is April to September, depending on elevation and latitude.

Carnivorous syndrome
In his 1999 journal article, G. G. Spomer tested several plants in the Pacific Northwest for the carnivorous syndrome, using the digestion of proteins as the diagnostic tool to determine which plants appeared to produce protease enzymes capable of breaking down potential prey. Geranium viscosissimum displayed a capability to digest and absorb the 14C-labeled algal protein placed on the sticky trichomes that the plant possesses. However, it is not known whether the digestive enzymes were produced by the plant itself or surface microbes. Additionally, some definitions of carnivory require the plant to gain some tangible benefit in capturing and digesting prey, such as increased seed yield or growth. Such an experiment has not been done with this species.

Uses
The flowers and leaves of this species are edible, but reported to be astringent. The flowers can be added to salads or used as a garnish.

Medicinal
Blackfeet Indians used an infusion from this plant to treat diarrhea and gastric upset and urinary irritations.  The root of this plant is astringent and was dried and powdered and used by Native Americans to stop external bleeding.

An infusion of the leaves has also been used to treat colds and sore throats. The leaves and roots have been made into a poultice and used to treat sore eyes via an infusion.

Cultivation
Geranium viscosissimum is cultivated as an ornamental plant by specialty plant nurseries, for use in native plant and wildlife gardens.  The plant attracts butterflies.

See also 
 Potentilla arguta

References

External links
 Calflora Database: Geranium viscosissimum'' (Sticky purple geranium)
  UC CalPhotos gallery for Geranium viscosissimum

viscosissimum
Flora of the Northwestern United States
Flora of Western Canada
Flora of California
Flora of Nevada
Flora of the Great Basin
Flora of the Rocky Mountains
Garden plants of North America
Plants used in traditional Native American medicine
Flora without expected TNC conservation status